Charles Stewart QC was a barrister and independent politician in Northern Ireland.

Career 
Stewart was elected for the Queen's University of Belfast at the 1958 Northern Ireland general election. Independent politician Eileen M. Hickey, known for her Irish nationalist sympathies, had chosen not to contest the election.

Stewart retained his seat at the 1962 general election and was returned unopposed in 1965.  He resigned in October 1966.

Following his resignation, Stewart was active as a magistrate into the 1970s and had been appointed Chief Justice of Cameroon.

References

Year of birth missing
Possibly living people
Members of the House of Commons of Northern Ireland 1958–1962
Members of the House of Commons of Northern Ireland 1962–1965
Members of the House of Commons of Northern Ireland 1965–1969
Independent members of the House of Commons of Northern Ireland
Members of the House of Commons of Northern Ireland for Queen's University of Belfast
20th-century King's Counsel
Northern Ireland King's Counsel
Cameroonian judges